Bernadette Pujals (born 8 July 1968) is a Mexican Olympic dressage rider. Representing Mexico, she competed at two Summer Olympics (in 2008 and 2016). Her best Olympic result came at the 2008 Beijing Games, where she achieved 9th position in the individual dressage competition.

Pujals also competed at two editions of World Equestrian Games (in 1998 and 2006). Her current best World Equestrian Games results came in 2006, when she placed 10th in both special and freestyle dressage competitions.

Pujals has won several medals at Pan American Games and at Central American and Caribbean Games.

In 2020 she decided to ride under the Spanish flag.

References

External links
 

Living people
1968 births
Mexican female equestrians
Spanish female equestrians
Mexican dressage riders
Spanish dressage riders
Equestrians at the 2008 Summer Olympics
Equestrians at the 2016 Summer Olympics
Olympic equestrians of Mexico
Equestrians at the 1999 Pan American Games
Equestrians at the 2003 Pan American Games
Equestrians at the 2011 Pan American Games
Equestrians at the 2015 Pan American Games
Equestrians at the 2019 Pan American Games
Pan American Games bronze medalists for Mexico
Pan American Games medalists in equestrian
Central American and Caribbean Games gold medalists for Mexico
Central American and Caribbean Games silver medalists for Mexico
Central American and Caribbean Games bronze medalists for Mexico
Competitors at the 2002 Central American and Caribbean Games
Competitors at the 2006 Central American and Caribbean Games
Competitors at the 2010 Central American and Caribbean Games
Competitors at the 2014 Central American and Caribbean Games
Spanish emigrants to Mexico
Central American and Caribbean Games medalists in equestrian
Medalists at the 1999 Pan American Games
Medalists at the 2003 Pan American Games
20th-century Mexican women
21st-century Mexican women
21st-century Spanish women